The Institute of Bioinformatics and Biotechnology (IBB) is an autonomous institute with an affiliation to the University of Pune. It was established in 2002 under the 'University with Potential for Excellence' program funded by the University Grants Commission of India (UGC). It was established with a view to promote research and development activities in bioinformatics and biotechnology, with a focus on creation of high quality research environment and human resources.

IBB is situated on the campus of University of Pune, India. It has been widely regarded that IBB shares the same relationship with the University of Pune as the Center for Excellence in Basic Sciences, Mumbai shares with the University of Mumbai.

Programs at the Institute 
In its pursuit of human resource development, IBB has launched two courses at Masters’ level:

 Five years integrated M.Sc. (Biotechnology) / six years M.Tech. (Biotechnology) programme
 Two years M.Sc. (Virology) programme
 Ph.D.
 Post-doctoral programme

See also
 Institute of Genomics and Integrative Biology

References

External links
  Institute of Bioinformatics and Biotechnology
 University of Pune
 University Grants Commission, India

Savitribai Phule Pune University
Biological research institutes
Research institutes established in 2002
2002 establishments in Maharashtra